Otto Mencke (22 March 1644 – 18 January 1707) was a 17th-century German philosopher and scientist.

Work
Mencke obtained his doctorate at the University of Leipzig in August 1666 with a thesis entitled: Ex Theologia naturali – De Absoluta Dei Simplicitate, Micropolitiam, id est Rempublicam In Microcosmo Conspicuam.

He is notable as being the founder of the very first scientific journal in Germany, established 1682, entitled Acta Eruditorum. He was a professor of moral philosophy at the University of Leipzig, but is more famous for his scientific genealogy that produced a fine lineage of mathematicians that includes notables such as Carl Friedrich Gauss and David Hilbert.

The Mathematics Genealogy Project database records more than 102,000 mathematicians and other scientists in his lineage. The Philosophy Family Tree records 535 philosophers in his lineage .

Isaac Newton and Mencke were in correspondence in 1693.

References

External links
 

1644 births
1707 deaths
People from Oldenburg (city)
German philosophers
German male writers